The GfK Entertainment hip hop albums chart is the official hip hop albums music chart in Germany and are gathered and published by GfK Entertainment (formerly Media Control and Media Control GfK International) on behalf of Bundesverband Musikindustrie. The chart was officially introduced on 1 April 2015. The chart week runs from Friday to Thursday with the official chart being published on the following Wednesday. The charts are based on sales of physical albums from retail outlets as well as permanent music downloads and streaming.

Number-one albums

Most weeks at number-one

Most number-one albums

See also
 GfK Entertainment charts

References

External links
 Official hip hop albums charts

German record charts
GfK